Edward "Eddie" Mulheron (3 May 1942 – 20 March 2015) was a Scottish association football defender.

Mulheron signed for Clyde, his first and only senior Scottish club, in 1963. He went on to make 249 appearances in all competitions, scoring just 2 goals. He was the captain of Clyde for several seasons, and a firm favourite with the fans. He left Clyde and Scotland in 1972, to join Durban United in South Africa.

References 

2015 deaths
Scottish footballers
Clyde F.C. players
Scottish Football League players
Benburb F.C. players
Scottish expatriate footballers
Expatriate soccer players in South Africa
1942 births
Association football defenders